James Browne (1842–1917) was an Irish Roman Catholic clergyman who served as the Bishop of Ferns from 1884 to 1917.

Born in Mayglass, County Wexford, Ireland on 28 August 1842, Browne studied in Maynooth College where he was ordained to the priesthood on 25 December 1865. He was appointed bishop of the Diocese of Ferns on 6 July 1884 and consecrated on 14 September 1884 by James Lynch, Bishop of Kildare and Leighlin.

Browne died in office on 21 June 1917, aged 74 years old.

References

1842 births
1917 deaths
People from Ferns
Roman Catholic bishops of Ferns
19th-century Roman Catholic bishops in Ireland
Alumni of St Patrick's College, Maynooth
20th-century Roman Catholic bishops in Ireland